A: Ad Infinitum is a 2021 Indian Telugu-language medical thriller film directed by Ugandhar Muni which stars Nithin Prasanna and Preethi Asrani in lead roles. The film was released on 5 March 2021 to mixed to positive reviews and on Amazon Prime, streaming from 16 March 2021.

Plot
Sanjeev (Nithin Prasanna) is a disabled receptionist at a hospital who is married to a nurse Pallavi (Preethi Asrani) and has a daughter Amrutha or Ammu (Baby Deevana). Sanjeev met Pallavi while he was rescued from a forest 59 km away from Hyderabad by members of an NGO and admitted in the same hospital, having suffered from memory loss and having no recollection of his past life. He tries to lead a normal life but is haunted by a recurring dream of a dark room in which an unknown figure is performing brain surgery on a tonsured patient.

Officer Vishnu (Rangadham) of the Preventive Crimes Unit is tasked with a case of multiple abductions of children, mostly orphans and runaways. His only lead is a CCTV footage of a hooded man along with a dog kidnapping a child from the highway at the early hours of the morning. He locates a newspaper who witnessed the man with the dog and uses him to create a sketch of the suspect.

Sanjeev, wanting to know about who he is, takes the help of his friend Yasir who finds a picture of a lookalike of Sanjeev (of more than 30 years ago) in a book about the Emergency time in India. They find from the author that the man in the picture was a student leader called Ashwatthama who was wanted for bombing a police station but was never found. From another old friend and compatriot of Ashwatthama, they find that the last person who had seen him was his then-girlfriend Amrutha. However, they are unable to follow up as Pallavi chastises Sanjeev for going in search of his past and not paying attention to their daughter.

The suspect of the police sketch turns out to be Sanjeev and Vishnu arrests him despite having no other evidence. However, Pallavi and Yasir were able to prove his innocence by showing the CCTV footage of the hospital at the time of the kidnapping and proving his alibi. But, a man who looks exactly like Sanjeev takes Ammu from her school, which leads Vishnu to believe that Sanjeev and the kidnapper share a connection.

Sanjeev talks to the now-old Amrutha who tells him that the last time she saw Ashwatthama was about 41 years ago, when he told her that he was going to his brothers place, and he realises that the place Ashwatthama told about was the same place where he was found by the hospital staff. He goes to the forest and discovers a house, in which he finds the dark room in his recurring dreams along with several tonsured patients on which brain surgery had been performed. It is shown through his recovered memories that he is actually Ashwatthama who had gone to his brother Arjun to lay low after the bombing incident. Arjun was a doctor who was obsessed with studying the pituitary gland and controlling it, thereby stopping the ageing process and making one immortal. Arjun was able to perfect the process on himself and Ashwatthama/Sanjeev thereby stopping their ageing, but was unable to recreate the effect on others.

Sanjeev finds Ammu unconscious but safe and tries to escape with her but is stopped by Arjun who tells him that Ammu, being born of the immortal Sanjeev, holds the key to duplicating the effect on others. They are interrupted by Vishnu who had tracked Sanjeev's phone and followed him, but he is killed by Arjun. An enraged Sanjeev attacks Arjun and beats him, and sets fire to the house and the research of Arjun, thereby saving the other kidnapped children in the process and helping the police solve the case.

The end scenes show Inspector Yuvraj who had assisted Officer Vishnu telling Sanjeev that the property belonged to an Arjun and asking him if he knew who he was. Sanjeev lies that he has no recollection of the past, but Yuvraj notices the name of Sanjeev's father (which he had told Ammu for her family tree as part of the school project) and matches the same with the records he has of Arjun. The press conference by the police is also seen by a scarred and burned Arjun, who has a file on Ammu and is hellbent on completing his research at any cost.

Cast 

Nithin Prasanna as triple role Sanjeev, Ashwadhama & Arjun Muni 
 Preethi Asrani as Pallavi
 Baby Deevana as Amrutha
 Rangadham as Vishnu
 Jagan Yogiraj as Yasir

Soundtrack  

The music is composed by Vijay Kurakula and was released Aditya Music.

Home media 
The film is available on Amazon Prime Video

Reception  
The Times of India noted that " A decent attempt that tests your patience" and gave the film a rating of two-and-a-half out of five stars and stating that "Thrillers are not a genre often explored in Tollywood but director Ugandar Muni makes a decent attempt. The film’s leads end up delivering a decent performance."'

Indiaglitz stated "'A (Ad Infinitum)' is a slow burn thriller where science is an important element. There is also a political movement involved. It's a crime film and a semi-period drama, too. It's also an emotional family drama. The overlong film has got strong performances. However, it can test your patience if thrillers are not your thing."

123Telugu and nettv4u reviewed it with 2.5 our of 5 stars

References

External links

Indian thriller films
Films set in Andhra Pradesh
2020s Telugu-language films
2021 films
2021 thriller films